Aghvorik is a village in the Amasia Municipality of the Shirak Province of Armenia.

History 
Some of the ancestors of the village population emigrated from Western Armenia in 1828–1830. The village was mostly populated by Azerbaijanis. In 1988-1989, during the Nagorno-Karabakh conflict, local Azeris moved to Azerbaijan, and Armenian families resettled in the village.

Demographics

References 

Communities in Shirak Province
Populated places in Shirak Province